The Bodmer Papyri are a set of Greek and Coptic manuscripts, ranging from the 2nd to the 7th-centuries. These manuscripts were collected between the 1950s and 1960s by Swiss bibliophile, Martin Bodmer, who obtained them across Egypt. Many of these manuscripts are unique or early transcriptions of important Christian works, such as The Vision of Dorotheus or the Biblical ,  described by the Foundation Martin Bodmer as "highly important for the history of early Christianity", alongside several classical or Egyptological works, such as the works of Menander and Egyptian land and financial registers. Many of these papyri are parts of larger papyrus codexes, such as the Bodmer Composite Codex or Codex of Visions. These manuscripts, since Bodmer's death, have been scattered across several collections; primarily in the Bibliotheca Bodmeriana, these papyri are also found in the Chester Beatty Library, libraries in Mississippi, Cologne, Barcelona and the Vatican. Because of the efforts of the Fondation Bodmer and many scholars, these manuscripts have been prepared into editio princeps and digitized, allowing for scholarly access.

The following list is based on the catalogues of the Bodmer Lab, Brent Nongbri and Albert Pietersma. The numbering system of Bodmer Papyri is primarily based on the abbreviation "Papyrus Bodmer" with an Arabic numeral (e.g. Papyrus Bodmer 23). Some scholarship uses the older system of Roman numerals (e.g. Papyrus Bodmer XXIII) but this is inefficient for a sortable, online database, so it is used secondarily. Where a date range for a papyrus can be ascertained, it is included, but otherwise one isn't included. The "citation(s)" section refers to the editio princeps of the papyrus, alongside later text revisions or additions. When a papyrus is part of a larger codex, that codex's name is added.

Manuscripts

References

External links

 Bodmer Papyri at Bodmer Lab - Digital scans of most of the Bodmer Papyri
 Papyrus Bodmer 8 at the Vatican Library Website
 Papyrus Bodmer 14+15 (XIV+XV Codex) at the Vatican Library Website
 Papyrus Bodmer 24 at the Museum of the Bible Website

Papyrus
New Testament papyri
Ancient Christian texts
Egyptian papyri
Greek-language papyri